Coolawanyah Station Airport  is an airport located  west of Coolawanyah Station, in the Shire of Ashburton, part of the Pilbara region of Western Australia.

See also
 List of airports in Western Australia
 Aviation transport in Australia

References

External links
 Airservices Aerodromes & Procedure Charts
 AIP section of the Australian Air Services
 List of Australian aerodromes and their codes

Pilbara airports
Shire of Ashburton